Cordite is a family of smokeless propellants developed and produced in the United Kingdom since 1889 to replace black powder as a military propellant. Like modern gunpowder, cordite is classified as a low explosive because of its slow burning rates and consequently low brisance. These produce a subsonic deflagration wave rather than the supersonic detonation wave produced by brisants, or high explosives. The hot gases produced by burning gunpowder or cordite generate sufficient pressure to propel a bullet or shell to its target, but not so quickly as to routinely destroy the barrel of the gun.

Cordite was used initially in the .303 British, Mark I and II, standard rifle cartridge between 1891 and 1915; shortages of cordite in World War I led to the creation of the "Devil's Porridge" munitions factory (HM Factory, Gretna) on the English-Scottish border, which produced 800 tonnes of cordite per annum. The UK also imported some United States–developed smokeless powders for use in rifle cartridges. Cordite was also used for large weapons, such as tank guns, artillery, and naval guns. It has been used mainly for this purpose since the late 19th century by the UK and British Commonwealth countries. Its use was further developed before World War II, and as  Unrotated Projectiles for launching anti-aircraft weapons. Small cordite rocket charges were also developed for ejector seats made by the Martin-Baker Company. Cordite was also used in the detonation system of the Little Boy atomic bomb dropped over Hiroshima in August 1945.

The term "cordite" generally disappeared from official publications between the wars. During World War II, double-base propellants were very widely used, and there was some use of triple-base propellants by artillery. Triple-base propellants were used in post-war ammunition designs and remain in production for UK weapons; most double-base propellants left service as World War II stocks were expended after the war. For small arms it has been replaced by other propellants, such as the Improved Military Rifle (IMR) line of extruded powder or the WC844 ball propellant currently in use in the 5.56×45mm NATO. Production ceased in the United Kingdom around the end of the 20th century, with the closure of the last of the World War II cordite factories, ROF Bishopton. Triple-base propellant for UK service (for example, the 105 mm L118 Light Gun) is now manufactured in Germany.

Adoption of smokeless powder by the British government

Replacements for gunpowder (black powder)
Gunpowder, an explosive mixture of sulfur, charcoal and potassium nitrate (also known as saltpeter), was the original propellant employed in firearms  and fireworks. It was used from about the 10th or 11th century onward, but it had disadvantages, including the large quantity of smoke it produced. With the 19th-century development of various "nitro explosives", based on the reaction of nitric acid mixtures on materials such as cellulose and glycerin, a search began for a replacement for gunpowder.

Early European smokeless powders 
The first smokeless powder was developed in 1865 by Johann Edward Schultze. At the time of this breakthrough, Schultze was a captain of Prussian artillery. Schultze eventually rose to the rank of colonel. His formulation (dubbed Schultze Powder) was composed of nitrolignose impregnated with saltpetre or barium nitrate.

In 1882 the Explosive Company of Stowmarket introduced EC Powder, which contained nitro-cotton and nitrates of potassium and barium in a grain gelatinesed by ether alcohol. It had coarser grains than other nitrocellulose powders. It proved unsuitable for rifles, but it remained in long use for shotguns and was later used for grenades and fragmentation bombs.

In 1884, the French chemist Paul Vieille produced a smokeless propellant that had some success. It was made out of collodion (nitrocellulose dissolved in ethanol and ether), resulting in a plastic colloidal substance which was rolled into very thin sheets, then dried and cut up into small flakes. It was immediately adopted by the French military for their Mle 1886 infantry rifle and called Poudre B (for poudre blanche, or white powder) to distinguish it from black powder (gunpowder). The rifle and the cartridge developed to use this powder were known generically as the 8mm Lebel, after the officer who developed its 8 mm full metal jacket bullet.

The following year, 1887, Alfred Nobel invented and patented a smokeless propellant he called Ballistite. It was composed of 10% camphor, 45% nitroglycerine and 45% collodion (nitrocellulose). Over time the camphor tended to evaporate, leaving an unstable explosive.

Development 

A United Kingdom government committee, known as the "Explosives Committee", chaired by Sir Frederick Abel, monitored foreign developments in explosives and obtained samples of Poudre B and Ballistite; neither of these smokeless powders was recommended for adoption by the Explosives Committee.

Abel, Sir James Dewar and W Kellner, who was also on the committee, developed and jointly patented (Nos 5,614 and 11,664 in the names of Abel and Dewar) in 1889 a new ballistite-like propellant consisting of (by weight) 58% nitroglycerin, 37% guncotton (nitrocellulose) and 5% petroleum jelly. Using acetone as a solvent, it was extruded as spaghetti-like rods initially called "cord powder" or "the Committee's modification of Ballistite", but this was swiftly abbreviated to "Cordite".

Cordite began as a double-base propellant. In the 1930s triple-base was developed by including a substantial proportion of nitroguanidine. Triple-base propellant reduced the disadvantages of double-base propellant – its relatively high temperature and significant flash. Imperial Chemical Industries's (ICI) World War 2 double-base AN formulation also had a much lower temperature, but it lacked the flash reduction properties of N and NQ triple-base propellants.

Whilst cordite is classified as an explosive, it is not employed as a high explosive. It is designed to deflagrate, or burn, to produce high pressure gases.

Nobel and Abel patent dispute 

Alfred Nobel sued Abel and Dewar over an alleged patent infringement. His patent specified that the nitrocellulose should be "of the well-known soluble kind". After losing the case, it went to the Court of Appeal. This dispute eventually reached the House of Lords, in 1895, but it was finally lost because the words "of the well-known soluble kind" in his patent were taken to mean the soluble collodion, and hence specifically excluded the insoluble guncotton. The ambiguous phrase was "soluble nitro-cellulose": soluble nitro-cellulose was known as Collodion and was soluble in alcohol. It was employed mainly for medical and photographic use. In contrast, insoluble in alcohol, nitrocellulose was known as gun cotton and was used as an explosive. Nobel's patent refers to the production of Celluloid using camphor and soluble nitrocellulose; and this was taken to imply that Nobel was specifically distinguishing between the use of soluble and insoluble nitrocellulose. For a forensic analysis of the case see The History of Explosives Vol II; The Case for Cordite, John Williams (2014).  However, in her comprehensive 2019 biography of Alfred Nobel Ingrid Carlberg notes how closely Abel and Dewar were allowed to follow Nobel's work in Paris, and how disappointed Nobel was with how this trust was betrayed. The book argues for Nobel as the original inventor and that the case was lost because of an unimportant technicality.

Formulations 
It was quickly discovered that the rate of burning could be varied by altering the surface area of the cordite. Narrow rods were used in small-arms and were relatively fast burning, while thicker rods would burn more slowly and were used for longer barrels, such as those used in artillery and naval guns.

Cordite (Mk I) and Cordite MD 
The original Abel-Dewar formulation was soon superseded, as it caused excessive gun barrel erosion. It has since become known as Cordite Mk I.

The composition of cordite was changed to 65% guncotton, 30% nitroglycerin (keeping 5% petroleum jelly), and 0.8% acetone shortly after the end of the Second Boer War. This was known as Cordite MD (modified).

Cordite MD cartridges typically weighed approximately 15% more than the cordite Mk I cartridges they replaced, to achieve the same muzzle velocity, due to the inherently less powerful nature of Cordite MD.

Cordite RDB 
During World War I acetone was in short supply in Great Britain, and a new experimental form was developed for use by the Royal Navy. This was Cordite RDB (= Research Department formula B); which was 52% collodion, 42% nitroglycerin and 6% petroleum jelly. It was produced at HM Factory, Gretna; and the Royal Navy Cordite Factory, Holton Heath.

Acetone for the cordite industry during late World War I was eventually produced through the efforts of Dr. Chaim Weizmann, considered to be the father of industrial fermentation. While a lecturer at Manchester University Weizmann discovered how to use bacterial fermentation to produce large quantities of many desired substances. He used the bacterium Clostridium acetobutylicum (the so-called Weizmann organism) to produce acetone. Weizmann transferred the rights to the manufacture of acetone to the Commercial Solvents Corporation in exchange for royalties. After the Shell Crisis of 1915 during World War I, he was director of the British Admiralty Laboratories from 1916 until 1919.

Cordite RDB was later found to become unstable if stored too long.

Cordite SC 
Research on solvent-free Cordite RDB continued primarily on the addition of stabilizers, which led to the type commonly used in World War II as the main naval propellant. In Great Britain this was known as Cordite SC (= Solventless Cordite). Cordite SC was produced in different shapes and sizes, so the particular geometry of Cordite SC was indicated by the use of letters or numbers, or both, after the SC. For example, SC followed by a number was rod-shaped cord, with the number representing the diameter in thousandths of an inch. "SC T" followed by two sets of numbers indicated tubular propellant, with the numbers representing the two diameters in thousandths.

Two-inch (approximately 50 mm) and three-inch (approximately 75 mm) diameter, rocket Cordite SC charges were developed in great secrecy before World War II for anti-aircraft purposes—the so-called Z batteries, using 'Unrotated Projectiles'.

Great Britain changed to metric units in the 1960s, so there was a discontinuity in the propellant geometry numbering system.

Cordite N 
An important development during World War II was the addition of another explosive, nitroguanidine, to the mixture to form triple-base propellant or Cordite N and NQ. The formulations were slightly different for artillery and naval use. This solved two problems associated with the large naval guns fitted to British Navy's capital ships: gun flash and muzzle erosion.  Nitroguanidine produces large amounts of nitrogen when heated, which had the benefit of reducing the muzzle flash, and its lower burning temperature greatly reduced the erosion of the gun barrel.

N and NQ were also issued in limited amounts to ammunitions used by the British 25-pdr and 5.5-inch land-based artillery pieces.

After World War II production of double-base propellants generally ended. Triple-base propellants, N and NQ, were the only ones used in new ammunition designs, such as the cartridges for 105 mm Field and for 155 mm FH70.

Charge design

Manufacture

UK Government factories 
In Great Britain cordite was developed for military use at the Royal Arsenal by Abel, Dewar and Kellner, Woolwich, and produced at the Waltham Abbey Royal Gunpowder Mills from 1889 onwards.

At the start of World War I cordite was in production at Waltham Abbey Royal Gunpowder Mills and by seven other suppliers (British Explosives Syndicate Ltd, Chilworth Gunpowder Company Ltd, Cotton Powder Company Ltd, Messrs Curtis's and Harvey Ltd, National Explosives Company Ltd, New Explosives Company Ltd and Nobels Explosive Company Ltd).
. Existing factories were expanded and new ones built notably by Nobel's at Ardeer, HM Factory, Gretna, which straddled the Scotland-England border at Gretna, and the Royal Navy Cordite Factory, Holton Heath
. A factory was also established by the Indian Government at Nilgris.  Both the Gretna and the Holton Heath cordite factories closed at the end of World War I.

By the start of World War II Holton Heath had reopened, and an additional factory for the Royal Navy, The Royal Navy Propellant Factory, Caerwent, opened at Caerwent in Wales. A very large Royal Ordnance Factory, ROF Bishopton, was opened in Scotland to manufacture cordite for the British Army and the Royal Air Force. A new cordite factory at Waltham Abbey and two additional ROF's—ROF Ranskill and ROF Wrexham—were also opened. Cordite produced in these factories was sent to filling factories for filling into ammunition.

MoS Agency Factories and ICI Nobel in World War II 
The British Government set up additional cordite factories, not under Royal Ordnance Factory control but as Agency Factories run on behalf of the Ministry of Supply (MoS). The company of ICI Nobel, at Ardeer, was asked in 1939 to construct and operate six factories in southern Scotland. Four of these six were involved in cordite or firearm-propellant manufacture. The works at MoS Drungans (Dumfries) produced guncotton that was converted to cordite at MoS Dalbeattie (triple-base cordite) and at MoS Powfoot (monobase granulated guncotton for small-arms). A smaller site at Girvan, South Ayrshire, now occupied by Grant's distillery, produced cordite and TNT. The ICI Ardeer site also had a mothballed World War I Government-owned cordite factory.

35% of British cordite produced between 1942 and 1945 came from Ardeer and these agency factories. ICI ran a similar works at Deer Park (which was also confusingly known as Ardeer after the adjacent suburb) near Melbourne in Australia and in South Africa.

Overseas supplies 
Additional sources of propellant were also sought from the British Commonwealth in both World War I and World War II. Canada, South Africa, and Australia had ICI-owned factories that, in particular, supplied large quantities of cordite.

World War I 
Canadian Explosives Limited was formed in 1910 to produce rifle cordite, at its Beloeil factory, for the Quebec Arsenal. By November 1915 production had been expanded to produce 350,000 lb (159,000 kg) of cordite per month for the Imperial Munitions Board.

The Imperial Munitions Board set up a number of additional explosives factories in Canada. It built The British Cordite Ltd factory at Nobel, Ontario, in 1916/1917, to produce cordite. Production started in mid-1917.

Canadian Explosives Limited built an additional cordite factory at Nobel, Ontario. Work started in February 1918 and was finished on 24 August 1918. It was designed to produce 1,500,000 lb (681,000 kg) of cordite per month.

Factories, specifically "heavy industry" (Long, and Marland 2009) were important for the provision of munitions. Cordite factories typically employed women (Cook 2006) who put their lives at risk as they packed the shells.

Production quantities 
Large quantities of cordite were manufactured in both World Wars for use by the military.

Pre–World War I
Prior to World War I, most of the cordite used by the British Government was produced in its own factories. Immediately prior to World War I, between 6,000 and 8,000 tons per year of cordite were produced in the United Kingdom by private manufacturers; between 1,000 and 1,500 tons per year were made by Nobel's Explosives, at Ardeer. However, private industry had the capability to produce about 10,000 tons per year, with Ardeer able to produce some 3,000 tons of this total.

World War I 
At the start of World War I, private industry in the UK was asked to produce 16,000 tons of cordite, and all the companies started to expand. HM Factory, Gretna, the largest propellant factory in the United Kingdom, which opened in 1916, was by 1917 producing 800 tons (812 tonne) of Cordite RDB per week (approximately 41,600 tons per year). The Royal Navy had its own factory at Holton Heath.

In 1910, Canadian Explosives Limited produced 3,000 lb (1,362 kg) of rifle cordite per month at its Beloeil factory, for the Quebec Arsenal. By November 1915 production had been expanded to 350,000 lb (159,000 kg) of cordite per month (approximately 1,900 tonnes per year).
The Canadian Explosives Limited cordite factory at Nobel, Ontario was designed to produce 1,500,000 lb (681 tonne) of cordite per month (approximately 8,170 tonnes per year).

Between wars 
HM Factory, Gretna and the Royal Navy Cordite Factory, Holton Heath both closed after the end of the war and the Gretna factory was dismantled. This left the Waltham Abbey and Ardeer factories in production.

World War II 
As noted above, in addition to its own facilities, the British Government had ICI Nobel set up a number of Agency Factories producing cordite in Scotland, Australia, Canada and South Africa.

Citations

Bibliography

External links

 AMMUNITION
 Sausalito News 2 June 1917 – California Digital Newspaper Collection

 
British inventions
Ammunition
Firearm propellants
Articles containing video clips